= Xaaxkax =

Coordinates: 19°45′00″N 088°10′00″W

Xaaxkax (also known as Yaaxbax) is a populated place in the Mexican state of Quintana Roo.
